Marcel Lepan (14 December 1909 – 10 March 1953) was a French coxswain. He competed in two events at the 1924 Summer Olympics, winning a silver medal in the men's coxed four.

References

External links
 

1909 births
1953 deaths
French male rowers
Olympic rowers of France
Rowers at the 1924 Summer Olympics
People from Boulogne-sur-Mer
Olympic medalists in rowing
Medalists at the 1924 Summer Olympics
Olympic silver medalists for France
Coxswains (rowing)
Sportspeople from Pas-de-Calais
20th-century French people